The 28th Golden Eagle Awards ceremony was held in Changsha, Hunan, China, on October 16, 2016.

Winners

References

External links
 List of Winners of the 28th Golden Eagle Awards 

2016
2016 in Chinese television
2016 television awards
Events in Changsha
Mass media in Changsha